The 55th New York Infantry Regiment (aka Gardes de Lafayette) was an infantry regiment in the Union Army during the American Civil War predominantly made up of French immigrants.

Service

The 55th New York Infantry was organized in camp near New Dorp, Staten Island, New York and mustered in August 28, 1861 under the command of Colonel Régis de Trobriand. Company B did not join the regiment until April 1862.

The regiment was attached to Peck's Brigade, Buell's Division, Army of the Potomac, to March 1862. 2nd Brigade, 1st Division, IV Corps, Army of the Potomac, to September 1862. 3rd Brigade, 1st Division, III Corps, to November 1862. 2nd Brigade, 1st Division, III Corps, to December 1862.

The 55th New York Infantry ceased to exist on December 21, 1862 when it was consolidated with the 38th New York Infantry as Companies G, H, I, and K.

Detailed service
Left New York for Washington, D.C., August 31, 1861. Duty at Fort Gaines, Md., September and October 1861. Duty in the defenses of Washington, D.C., until March 1862. Marched to Prospect Hill, Va., March 11–15. Moved to the Peninsula, Virginia, March 28. Siege of Yorktown April 5–May 4. Battle of Williamsburg May 5. Operations about Bottom's Bridge May 20–23. Battle of Seven Pines May 31 – June 1. Seven days before Richmond June 25 – July 1. Malvern Hill July 1. At Harrison's Landing until August 16. Movement to Fort Monroe, then to Centreville August 16–29. Duty in the defenses of Washington until October. Movement to Falmouth, Va., October–November. Battle of Fredericksburg, Va., December 12–15.

Casualties
The regiment lost a total of 62 men during service; 33 enlisted men killed or mortally wounded, 29 enlisted men died of disease.

Commanders
 Colonel Régis de Trobriand
 Lieutenant Colonel Louis Thourot - commanded during the Seven Days Battles

See also

 List of New York Civil War regiments
 New York in the Civil War

References
 Dyer, Frederick H. A Compendium of the War of the Rebellion (Des Moines, IA: Dyer Pub. Co.), 1908.
Attribution

External links
 Regimental flag of the 55th New York

Military units and formations established in 1861
1861 establishments in New York (state)
Military units and formations disestablished in 1862
Infantry 055